İlxıçı (also, Ilxıçı, Gasan Efendi, Həsən Əfəndi, Il’khychy-Gasanefendi, Il’kichi-Kazeya, and Ilkhychy) is a village and municipality in the Khachmaz Rayon of Azerbaijan.  It has a population of 617.  The municipality consists of the villages of İlxıçı and Qarğalıq.

References 

Populated places in Khachmaz District